Whittier College is a private liberal arts college in Whittier, California. It is a Hispanic Serving Institution (HSI) and, as of fall 2022, had approximately 1,300 (undergraduate and graduate) students. It was founded in 1887.

History
Whittier College, founded in 1887, was named for the Quaker abolitionist and poet John Greenleaf Whittier. Since that time, the institution has grown into a distinctive, national liberal arts college. The college campus has about 1,300 students who live there and study with more than 100 faculty. It emphasizes small, interactive classes led by full-time faculty members.

Although the college has maintained no formal affiliation with the Religious Society of Friends since the 1940s, the social values of its Quaker heritage—respect for the individual, freedom of conscience, integrity, justice, and internationalism—strongly influence its ethos. From its beginning, these views dictated that the college open its doors to persons of both genders as well as all races and cultures.

Academics
Whittier College is a four-year liberal arts institution. Nearly half of the student body are Latino and students of color constitute about 70% of the college's campus population. A majority of students hail from California but the college also draws students from the Pacific Northwest, East Coast, Midwest and Hawaii, as well as international students. As of 2017, there are students from at least 27 states and 14 countries.

Whittier offers over 30 majors and 30 minors in 23 disciplines and claims emphasis on interdisciplinary learning. Students may also apply for entry into the Whittier Scholars Program, in which each student, under the guidance of a faculty member, designs their own major and course of study based on individual interests and career goals. Professional internships and service projects are required or recommended as part of many academic programs. Study abroad is offered in semester- or year-long affiliated programs. There is also an optional January interim session, which is a four-week intensive "mini-semester" that typically involves fieldwork and faculty-led international travel. Its most popular undergraduate majors, based on 2021 graduates, were
Business Administration and Management (62)
Exercise Science and Kinesiology (52)
Biology/Biological Sciences (40)
Psychology (38)
Social Sciences (29)
English Language and Literature (24)

Whittier College hosts a Faculty House Program, which is modeled after similar programs at Oxford and Cambridge Universities. In this program, faculty are selected as faculty-in-residence for a multi-year term, live in houses located on-campus, and create and host in their homes educational and social programs around a specific theme, such as health and society, writers and writing, alumni connections, and Spanish culture.

Additionally, the college's graduate program in education offers both credential and Master of Arts in education degree programs. Broadoaks Children's School – a private, non-profit demonstration school on the Whittier campus – serves as a learning laboratory for Whittier faculty and students, at both the undergraduate and graduate levels.

Whittier Law School
Whittier Law School was located on a satellite campus in Costa Mesa, California. It started in the Hancock Park section of Los Angeles in 1966 as Beverly Law School. In 1975, Beverly College joined Whittier with the law school moving to Costa Mesa in 1997. Whittier Law School has 4,500 alumni, practicing in 48 states and 14 countries. The school was accredited by the American Bar Association (ABA) beginning in 1978 and was a member of the Association of American Law Schools (AALS) beginning 1987.

On April 19, 2017, the Law School announced that it would stop admitting students and begin the process of shutting down. The school ceased operations in July 2020.

Enrollment 
Whittier College has traditionally enrolled between 1200-1500 undergraduate students, allowing for most classes to be seminars. Since 1984, Whittier College has averaged an undergraduate population of 1329 students, but the average student body size increased to over 1600 students during the 2010s. For example, fall undergraduate enrollment was 1387 in 2021, compared to the enrollment of 969 in 1984.

Student life

Whittier College has approximately 80 registered, student-run organizations. The college also has Societies similar to fraternities and sororities. There are 11 societies: the Franklin Society (men), the Lancer Society (men), the Orthogonian Society (men), the William Penn Society (men), Palmer Society (women), the Ionian Society (women), the Metaphonian Society (women), the Thalian Society (women), the Athenian Society (women), the Sachsen Society (coed), and the Paragonian Society (gender neutral). Most of these societies began as literary societies.

Other campus groups include student publications, the Quaker Campus newspaper and television; the student-run radio station, KPOET Radio; Video Productions Studios; and the Whittier College Sports Network.

Athletics

The Whittier Poets compete in the Southern California Intercollegiate Athletic Conference (SCIAC) of NCAA Division III. The school has fielded sports teams for over 100 years. Its current teams include men's and women's basketball, cross country, soccer, swimming and diving, tennis, track and field, lacrosse and water polo, women's softball and volleyball, and men's baseball and golf. In November 2022, Whittier announced that it is discontinuing its football team, men’s lacrosse and men’s and women’s golf.

The history of the Whittier football program began in 1907, and since the inception of the SCIAC in 1915, the Poets have won 26 conference titles. From 1957 to 1964, Whittier won eight straight SCIAC football titles under the direction of coaches George Allen (1951–1956), Don Coryell (1957–1959), and John Godfrey (1960–1979). Their most recent championships came back-to-back in 1997 and 1998. Twenty-three Poets have earned All-American honors, the most recent coming in 2007. The football program plays out of Newman Memorial Field, which seats 7,000. Whittier maintains a century-long football rivalry with Occidental Tigers. The two schools play for the shoes of 1939 All-American Myron Claxton. In November 2022, the school announced it will discontinue the football program.

The Whittier men's lacrosse program was established in 1980. In 1980, the Poets became a member of the Western Collegiate Lacrosse League (WCLL). From 1980 to 1999, Whittier won ten championships. In 1990, they were recognized by the NCAA, but continued to compete in the WCLL. The Poets were the team to beat throughout the 1990s and it was not until 2000 when Whittier made the decision to make their mark on the national scene by leaving the WCLL and focus on being selected for the NCAA tournament. On November 15, 2022, it was announced that Whittier College would discontinue their men's lacrosse program after the conclusion of their season.

Starting in 2004, another time in 2009, and two years in a row starting in 2013 and 2014. On the season the Poets finished 23–10 and ranked No. 1 in the country among Division III programs. Whittier shared the top spot with Redlands and was ranked No. 18 in the Men's National Collegiate Top 20 Poll—a poll that ranks all divisions of collegiate water polo.

For the first time in program history, the Whittier College Men's Cross-Country team earned a national ranking announced by the United States Track and Field and Cross Country Coaches Association. The Purple & Gold ranked #32 out of 400 teams.

The Whittier men's and women's swimming and diving teams earned Academic All-American status—the women for the fourth straight year and the men for the first time, after the College Swimming Coaches Association of America (CSCAA) announced the programs who achieved this honor for the 2015 Fall Semester. Five hundred forty-seven swimming and diving teams representing 354 colleges and universities have been named College Swimming Coaches Association of America (CSCAA) Scholar All-American Teams. The awards are in recognition of teams that achieved a grade point average of 3.0 or higher during the 2015 fall semester.

The termination of football, lacrosse and golf in Fall 2022 was greeted with controversy and protests.

Notable alumni

Notable alumni include former U.S. President Richard Nixon; actress Andrea Barber, known from the television comedy Full House and Fuller House; video blogger Cassey Ho; actors and brothers Geoff Stults, and George Stults; author Jessamyn West; and Susan Herrman, who was one of two white female "student Freedom Riders" who sought to desegregate interstate bus travel in the South in 1961.

Academia
Willa Baum, historian and pioneer of oral history

Arts
James Adomian, comedian
Dorothy Baker, author
Andrea Barber, actress, best known for playing Kimmy Gibbler on the ABC sitcom Full House and its Netflix spin-off Fuller House
Charles Bock, author, best known for his novel Beautiful Children which was selected by The New York Times as one of their "100 Notable Books of 2008"
Herschel Daugherty, film, television and theatre director
Ken Davitian, actor, Borat
Bill Handel, radio personality 
Cheryl Boone Isaacs, past president of the Academy of Motion Picture Arts and Sciences
Chris Jacobs, actor and co-host of Discovery Channel's television show Overhaulin'
Roger Lodge, television host
Lupita Nyong'o (attended), actress, 12 Years a Slave
Salvador Plascencia, author, best known for his novel The People of Paper
Arthur Allan Seidelman, Emmy Award-winning director
Williametta Spencer, composer
Geoff Stults, actor, 7th Heaven
George Stults, actor, 7th Heaven
Zilpha Keatley Snyder, Newbery Award-winning author; best known for The Egypt Game
Linda Vallejo, artist
Jessamyn West, author
Harry Adams, African-American photographer

Business
Fred D. Anderson, former CFO of Apple Computer
Peter L. Harris, former CEO of FAO Schwarz, former CEO of the San Francisco 49ers
Arturo C. Porzecanski, Wall Street economist and university professor

Government
Florence-Marie Cooper, former United States federal judge
Robert D. Durham, justice, Oregon Supreme Court
John Fasana, mayor of Duarte, California
Wayne R. Grisham, former member of the U.S. House of Representatives
Richard Nixon, 37th President of the United States
George E. Outland, former member of the U.S. House of Representatives
Gregory Salcido, former mayor of Pico Rivera, California
Tony Strickland, former California state senator

Medicine
Albert R. Behnke, U.S. Navy physician who established the U.S. Naval Medical Research Institute
William F. House, surgeon who developed the cochlear implant

Religion
R. Kent Hughes, former pastor of College Church in Wheaton, Illinois, and author of numerous books
David Moyer, bishop in the Traditional Anglican Communion

Sports
Peter Baron, team manager of Starworks Motorsport.
Ila Borders, first female pitcher to start in a professional baseball game
Hubie Brooks, (attended) former Major League Baseball player
Jim Colborn, former Major League Baseball pitcher
Elvin Hutchison, former National Football League player and official
Gary Jones, former Major League Baseball pitcher
Steve Jones, former Major League Baseball pitcher
Timo Liekoski, Finnish soccer coach
Brian Kelly, former Major League Lacrosse player
Wally Kincaid, college baseball coach
Chuck McMurtry, former defensive tackle in the American Football League
Tony Malinosky, former Major League Baseball player
Russ Purnell, former special teams coach for the NFL team Jacksonville Jaguars
Jamie Quirk, former Major League Baseball player
Gary Roenicke, former Major League Baseball outfielder
Brendan Schaub, (attended) member of football and lacrosse teams; former NFL candidate, former mixed martial artist for the Ultimate Fighting Championship, stand-up comedian
Jim Skipper, retired National Football League assistant coach.
Don Sutton, Hall of Fame baseball player
Geoff Stults, played football for the Poets, and also professionally in the Austrian Football League, Actor

Notable people

Coaches
George Allen, head football coach for the Poets from 1951 to 1956. Former NFL head coach and a member of the Pro Football Hall of Fame.
Jerry Burns, former head coach Minnesota Vikings of the NFL. Assistant coach for Poets football team in 1952.
Leo B. Calland, former college football and basketball coach; highest winning percentage of any basketball coach at USC
Don Coryell, head football coach for the Poets from 1957 to 1959. First and only coach to win at least 100 games at both the collegiate level and in the NFL
Ty Knott, former assistant coach for the Poets. Former NFL assistant coach with the Jacksonville Jaguars, New Orleans Saints, and Green Bay Packers.
Duval Love, offensive line coach for the Poets in 2008. Former NFL offensive lineman.
Samie Parker, wide receivers coach for the Poets in 2019. Former NFL wide receiver.
Omarr Smith, defensive backs coach for the Poets in 2004. Former defensive back for the San Jose SaberCats of the Arena Football League
Wallace Newman, head football coach for the Poets from 1929 to 1950. American Indian Tribal leader and mentor to future President of the United States Richard Nixon
Hugh Mendez, Former head football 1980-89 and baseball coach 1971-87 for Poets. Former head coach in Austrian Football League, German Football League and other European leagues.

Notes

References

External links

Official Athletics Website
KPOETradio student radio station

 
Quaker universities and colleges
Whittier, California
Educational institutions established in 1887
Schools accredited by the Western Association of Schools and Colleges
Universities and colleges in Los Angeles County, California
Liberal arts colleges in California
1887 establishments in California
Private universities and colleges in California